The Icelandic men's national under 20 ice hockey team is the national under-20 ice hockey team in Iceland. The team represents Iceland at the International Ice Hockey Federation's IIHF World U20 Championship.

International competitions

World Junior Championships

References

Ice hockey teams in Iceland
Junior national ice hockey teams
Ice hockey